Moreing is a surname. Notable people with the surname include:

Adrian Moreing (1892–1940), British politician
Algernon Moreing (1889–1974), British politician, Member of Parliament